Hugo Laur (20 March 1893 Käru, Simuna Parish, Wierland County – 20 December 1977 Tallinn) was an Estonian actor.

1918-1949 he worked at Estonia Theatre, and 1949–1965 at Estonian Drama Theatre.

1951-1954 he was a member of Supreme Soviet of the Estonian Soviet Socialist Republic.

Selected filmography
 1930 Kire lained (feature film; role: Bratt)
 1947 Elu tsitadellis (feature film; role: Professor August Miilas, botanist)
 1951 Valgus Koordis (feature film; role: Saamu)
 1955: Kui saabub õhtu	(feature film; role: Narrator)
 1955: Andruse õnn	(feature film; role: Vaga)
 1956 Tagahoovis (feature film; role: Soin)
 1957: Juunikuu päevad (feature film)
 1959: Kutsumata külalised	(feature film; role: Reps)
 1962 Jääminek (feature film; role: Laas Lautrikivi)
 1963 Jäljed	(feature film; role: Julius Raagen)
 1963: Jalgrattataltsutajad (feature film; role: Bicycle factory guard)	
 1964: Põrgupõhja uus Vanapagan (feature film; role: Filth hauler)
 1965: Me olime 18-aastased (feature film; role: Teenus)
 1968: Hullumeelsus (feature film)
 1969: Viimne reliikvia (feature film)
 1970:	Valge laev	(feature film; role: Jalans)
 1970: Kolme katku vahel (television film; role: Old Slahter)
 1971: Tuuline rand (feature film; role: Pime-Kaarli)

References

1893 births
1977 deaths
People from Väike-Maarja Parish
People from Kreis Wierland
Communist Party of the Soviet Union members
Members of the Supreme Soviet of the Estonian Soviet Socialist Republic, 1951–1955
Estonian male stage actors
Estonian male musical theatre actors
Estonian male film actors
Estonian male television actors
Estonian male radio actors
20th-century Estonian male actors
20th-century Estonian male singers
People's Artists of the Estonian Soviet Socialist Republic
Stalin Prize winners
Recipients of the Order of Lenin